Tom Hankins (born January 22, 1966) is an American basketball head coach for the Fort Wayne Mad Ants of the NBA G League.

Early life and college career
Hankins attended Thomas Edison High School in Tulsa, Oklahoma, graduating in 1984. He was a high school teammate of future NBA executive Kevin Pritchard. Hankins played college basketball at Northeastern Oklahoma A&M College and Northeastern State University. He worked as a graduate assistant at Northeastern Oklahoma A&M under coach Larry Gipson.

Coaching career

Northwest Missouri State
Hankins served as assistant coach for Northwest Missouri State in the 1991–1992 season.

East Central High School
In 1992 Hankins joined East Central High School in Tulsa, Oklahoma to serve as an assistant coach. He coached there until 1997.

Oral Roberts University
In 1997 Hankins joined Oral Roberts University as an assistant coach. He served as assistant until 2012, working with head coaches Barry Hinson and Scott Sutton. He helped the team to five Summit League titles and three NCAA tournament appearances.

Southern Illinois University
In 2012 Hankins was hired as an assistant head coach for Southern Illinois University, reuniting with Barry Hinson. He served as an assistant until 2015.

University of Central Oklahoma
In 2015 Hankins was hired by University of Central Oklahoma to serve as head coach. 
 In 2019 Hankins resigned as head coach.

Indiana Pacers 
In 2019 Hankins was hired by the Indiana Pacers to serve as the assistant player development coach. He was with the Pacers for the 2019–2020 season,
 focusing on players such as Naz Mitrou-Long and Brian Bowen.

Fort Wayne Mad Ants
In January 2021, Hankins was hired as the head coach of the Fort Wayne Mad Ants.

Head coaching record

College

References

Living people
American men's basketball coaches
American men's basketball players
Basketball coaches from Oklahoma
Basketball players from Oklahoma
Central Oklahoma Bronchos men's basketball coaches
College men's basketball head coaches in the United States
Fort Wayne Mad Ants coaches
Northeastern Oklahoma A&M Golden Norsemen basketball players
Northeastern State RiverHawks men's basketball players
Northwest Missouri State Bearcats men's basketball coaches
Northwest Missouri State University alumni
Oral Roberts Golden Eagles men's basketball coaches
Point guards
Southern Illinois Salukis men's basketball coaches
Sportspeople from Tulsa, Oklahoma
1966 births